Prachanda Kulla is a 1984 Indian Kannada-language film, directed by  P. S. Prakash and produced by Dwarakish. The film stars Vishnuvardhan, Dwarakish, Raadhika and Sudarshan. The film has musical score by G. K. Venkatesh.
The movie is famous for the sequence involving the hero lifting the Shiva idol (linga). The movie was dubbed in Tamil as Veera Mandra Kullan.

Cast

Vishnuvardhan as Shiva
Dwarakish as Rama
Raadhika as Pushpa
R. N. Sudarshan as Kinkini Sharma
Musuri Krishnamurthy as Thatturayya
Thoogudeepa Srinivas
Rajanand as King Pashupathi
Lokanath as Yogindra Muni
M. S. Umesh as Phaninaga
Chethan Ramarao as Mantri Patradeva
Prasanna as Kondanda Rudra
Rathnakar as Nanjundappa
Kanchana as Rama's mother
Geetha as Parvati
Silk Smitha special appearance in the song Nee Jana Endidde
Jayamalini special appearance in the song Nee Jana Endidde
Anuradha special appearance in the song Nee Jana Endidde
Devikarani
Sushma
Sadashiva Brahmavar as Rama's father
Lakshman
Shankar Rao as Ganganna
B. Hanumanthachar
M. Shivaji Rao
Shani Mahadevappa as Aryabhata
Y. R. Ashwath Narayan
Dingri Nagaraj
Gode Lakshminarayan
Rajanagesh
Saikumar

Soundtrack
The music was composed by G. K. Venkatesh.

References

External links
 
 

1984 films
1980s Kannada-language films
Films scored by G. K. Venkatesh